Japie Motale born 1 January 1979 in Pretoria) is a South African professional footballer, who last played for National First Division club Thanda Royal Zulu as a defender.

References 

1979 births
Living people
Association football defenders
Soccer players from Pretoria
South African soccer players
South Africa international soccer players
Mamelodi Sundowns F.C. players
SuperSport United F.C. players
Moroka Swallows F.C. players
Maritzburg United F.C. players
Black Leopards F.C. players
Thanda Royal Zulu F.C. players